KMDX (106.1 FM) is an American radio station licensed to San Angelo, Texas, United States, the station serves the San Angelo area playing a Rhythmic contemporary format.  The station is owned by Four R Broadcasting.

History
On February 15, 2007, the station was sold to Four R Broadcasting. In November 2007, the station dropped the moniker "Mix 106" in favor of the new brand "106-1 MDX."
From November 2007 until January 2012 the station used the slogan "San Angelo's Most New Hit Music." In January 2012 the station moved to the new slogan "All of Today's Hottest Hits & Fewest Commercials."  Most recent the station tweaked to a rhythmic based product.

Programming
 The Dana Cortez Show (Weekdays)
 C-MO

References

External links
 

MDX
Urban contemporary radio stations in the United States